Inspiria Knowledge Campus is a management college, established in 2010 in Siliguri, West Bengal, India by J.P. Sahu Foundation- a non-profit organization charitable trust registered under West Bengal Societies Registration Act, 1961 with an objective to make Indian youth employable.

Campus 
The campus is laid around a five-acre land in Siliguri, West Bengal on a site which was earlier a tea garden. The campus is situated at the foothills of Himalayas, with a stream flowing through the east of the campus and amongst much greenery.

Courses 
Inspiria offers the following undergraduate courses in computer applications, business administration, hospitality management and media sciences, under affiliation of Maulana Abul Kalam Azad University of Technology previously known as West Bengal University of Technology.
 School of Business - Bachelor of Business Administration (BBA)
 School of Computer Applications - BCA (Bachelor of Computer Application)
 School of Media Sciences - B.Sc in Media Sciences
 School of Hospitality Management - Bachelor of Hospitality Management
 Master of Business Administration - (MBA)
 School of Design & Media - Interior design
 School of Management  - Entrepreneurship
 School of Management  - Accounting
 School of Management  - Health administration
 School of Management  - International business
 School of Management  - Sports Management
 School of Management  - Entrepreneurship
 School of Design and Media  - Animation
 School of Design and Media  - Film

See also

References

External links 

Business schools in West Bengal
Universities and colleges in Darjeeling district
Education in Siliguri
Educational institutions established in 2010
2010 establishments in West Bengal